Kate Starre  (born 18 September 1971 in Armadale, Western Australia) is a former field hockey midfielder from Australia, who competed for her native country in three consecutive Summer Olympics, starting in 1992 (Barcelona, Spain). She was a member of the Australian Women's Hockey Team, best known as the Hockeyroos, that won the gold medals at the 1996 and the 2000 Summer Olympics.

She is the head coach for Canterbury Ladies 1XI, in England, from the start of the 2017–18 season. In June 2018, Starre joined the Fremantle Football Club's AFL Women's team as a high performance manager. One of her key areas of focus is implementing an anterior cruciate ligament (ACL) injury prevention program.

Starre was awarded the Medal of the Order of Australia (OAM) in the 1997 Australia Day Honours and the Australian Sports Medal in June 2000.

References

External links
 
 Australian Olympic Committee

1971 births
Living people
Australian female field hockey players
Field hockey players at the 1992 Summer Olympics
Field hockey players at the 1996 Summer Olympics
Field hockey players at the 2000 Summer Olympics
Olympic field hockey players of Australia
Olympic gold medalists for Australia
Commonwealth Games gold medallists for Australia
Olympic medalists in field hockey
Medalists at the 2000 Summer Olympics
Medalists at the 1996 Summer Olympics
Commonwealth Games medallists in field hockey
Field hockey players at the 1998 Commonwealth Games
Recipients of the Medal of the Order of Australia
Recipients of the Australian Sports Medal
20th-century Australian women
Field hockey players from Perth, Western Australia
Sportswomen from Western Australia
Medallists at the 1998 Commonwealth Games